A Thief in the Night is a 1972 evangelical Christian film written by Jim Grant, directed and produced by Donald W. Thompson. The film stars Patty Dunning as Patty Myers, the main character and protagonist, along with Thom Rachford, Colleen Niday, and Mike Niday in supporting roles. It is the first installment in the Thief in the Night series about the Rapture and the Tribulation. The film is set during the near future, focusing on Patty, a young woman who was not raptured and who struggles to decide what to do in the face of the Tribulation.

Background 
Russell Doughten and Donald W. Thompson, two Iowa-based filmmakers, formed Mark IV Pictures in 1972 to produce A Thief in the Night. Thompson had been working in radio. Doughten had worked with Good News Productions on The Blob in 1958, and had produced other films in Iowa through his production company Heartland Productions.

The film was produced in 1972 for a budget of $68,000. It earned roughly $4.2 million during its first decade of release, the majority of which came from audience donations. It was "one of the first films to take on Fundamentalist apocalyptic narratives within a fictional motif."

Plot
In medias res, Patty Myers awakens to a radio broadcast announcing the disappearance of millions around the world. The radio announcer suggests that this might be the Rapture of the Church spoken of in the Bible. Patty finds that her husband has also disappeared. The United Nations sets up an emergency government system called the United Nations Imperium of Total Emergency (UNITE) and declares that anyone who does not receive the Mark of the Beast identifying them with UNITE will be arrested.

Several flashbacks occur to times in Patty's life before the Rapture. The story begins with Patty and her two friends, who all have different destinies. Her friend Jenny considers Jesus Christ her Savior; her other friend Diane is more worldly-minded. Patty considers herself a Christian because she occasionally reads her Bible and goes to church regularly; however, her pastor is shown to be an unbeliever. She refuses to believe the warnings of her friends and family that she will go through the Great Tribulation if she does not put her faith in Christ. Meanwhile, her husband has been attending another church and has accepted Jesus. The next morning, Patty awakens to find that her husband and millions of others have suddenly disappeared.

Patty is conflicted: she refuses to trust Christ, yet she also refuses to take the Mark. She desperately tries to avoid UNITE and the Mark but is eventually captured. She escapes, but after a chase she is cornered by UNITE on a bridge and falls from the bridge to her death.

Patty awakens and realizes it has all been a dream. She is relieved, but her relief is short-lived when the radio announces that millions of people have in fact disappeared. Horrified, Patty frantically searches for her husband only to find he is missing too. Patty realizes that the Rapture has actually occurred and she has been left behind.

Cast
Patty Dunning as Patty Myers
Mike Niday as Jim Wright
Colleen Niday as Jenny
Maryann Rachford as Diane Bradford
Thom Rachford as Jerry Bradford
Duane Coller as Duane
Russell Doughten as Rev. Matthew Turner
Clarence Balmer as Pastor Balmer
Gareld L Jackson as UNITE Leader
Herb Brown as UNITE Officer
Herb Brown, Jr as UNITE Officer
Betty D. Jackson as Wedding Guest

Themes
The film's title is taken from 1 Thessalonians 5:2, in which Paul warns his readers that "the day of the Lord so cometh as a thief in the night."

The film presents a pre-tribulational dispensational Futurist interpretation of Christian Eschatology and the Rapture popular among U.S. Evangelicals, but is generally rejected by Roman Catholics, Orthodox Christians, Lutherans, and Reformed Christians. According to Dean Anderson of Christianity Today, "the film brings to life the dispensational view of Matthew 24:36-44." (See also: Views of Eschatological Timing)

In the film, everyone must receive the Mark of the Beast on their forehead or right hand in order to buy or sell. The film's producers used three rows of a binary number six ("0110") to represent the number 666, an interpretation of Revelation 13:11-18.

Production

Filming locations 
The movie was filmed entirely on location in Iowa, with scenes being shot in Carlisle, the Iowa State Fair, and at Red Rock dam.

Music 
The film's title track I Wish We'd All Been Ready was composed by singer/musician Larry Norman. It was performed in the film by The Fishmarket Combo. The song also became the anthem of the Jesus movement.

Legacy
A Thief in the Night has been translated into three languages and subtitled in others. In 1989, Randall Balmer wrote that the film's producer, Russell Doughten estimated that 100 million people had seen the film.  More recently, Dean Anderson writing for Christianity Today says it has been seen by an estimated 300 million.

It was a pioneer in the genre of Christian film, bringing rock music and elements of horror film to a genre then-dominated by family-friendly evangelicalism.  Randall Balmer has stated that, "It is only a slight exaggeration to say that A Thief in the Night affected the evangelical film industry the way that sound or color affected Hollywood." MIT professor of film and media Heather Hendershot says, "Today, many teen evangelicals have not seen A Thief in the Night, but virtually every evangelical over thirty I've talked to is familiar with it, and most have seen it... I have found that A Thief in the Night is the only evangelical film that viewers cite directly and repeatedly as provoking a conversion experience."

The film has been described as traumatic for children, who made up a significant part of its original audience, and criticized for using scare tactics to produce religious conversions. According to Hendershot, "Evangelicals who grew up in the 1970s or early 1980s often cite Thief as a source of childhood terror." This is partly due to depictions in the film of characters who believe themselves to be saved but are not, and are instead left behind.

A quarter century later, the authors of the Left Behind series of books and films have acknowledged their debt to Thief.  Indeed, even the title Left Behind echoes the refrain of Norman's theme song for A Thief in the Night, "I Wish We'd All Been Ready," in which he sings, "There's no time to change your mind, the Son has come and you've been left behind."

Sequels

 A Distant Thunder (1978)
 Image of the Beast (1981)
 The Prodigal Planet (1983)

References

External links
 A Thief in the Night at the Internet Movie Database
 Film review by G. Noel Gross, January 3, 2002
 Official website

1972 films
1970s science fiction films
Films about the rapture
Films about evangelicalism
Films about nightmares
Films based on the New Testament
Films produced by Russell S. Doughten
Films shot in Iowa
1970s English-language films
Films directed by Donald W. Thompson
American post-apocalyptic films
1970s American films